Animal Saints and Sinners is a series of British television documentaries produced for BBC One by Avalon. It follows the work of animal welfare officers.

References

External links
 Official site

2014 British television series debuts
2014 British television series endings
2010s British documentary television series
BBC television documentaries
BBC high definition shows
English-language television shows